The Milliyet Sports Awards are given by the Turkish daily Milliyet annually since 1954 in recognition of highest achievements in sports. The award is determined by a poll of Turkish professional footballers playing, athletes, teams, managers in Turkey and World. From 1954 until 2004, there was only one award "Turkish Athlete of the Year" or "Team of the Year".

Award

Athlete of the Year

Sport People of the Year

Manager of the Year

Team of the Year

Footballer of the Year

By player

By club

By country

References

External links
 Milli Resmi web sitesi - Temiz spor için el ele. Milliyet Gazetesi Genel Yayın Yönetmeni Sedat Ergin 

Awards established in 1954
1954 establishments in Turkey
Annual events in Turkey
Turkish awards
Sports culture in Turkey
Sports trophies and awards